Procyanidin A2 is an A type proanthocyanidin.

It is found in avocado, chestnut, cranberry juice concentrate, lychee fruit pericarp, peanut skins, Cinchona cortex, cinnamon cortex, Urvillea ulmaceae, and Ecdysanthera utilis.

Synthesis 
Procyanidin B2 can be converted into procyanidin A2 by radical oxidation using 1,1-diphenyl-2-picrylhydrazyl (DPPH) radicals under neutral conditions.

References 

 

Procyanidin dimers